Garlyk Sanctuary is a sanctuary (zakaznik) of Turkmenistan.

It is part of Köýtendag Nature Reserve. It was established for the protection of unique caves and other objects of the inanimate nature (marble onyx), protection of rare and endemic species of plants, preservation of juniper groves.

External links
 https://web.archive.org/web/20090609072344/http://natureprotection.gov.tm/reserve_tm.html

Sanctuaries in Turkmenistan